Ukwala Supermarkets, often referred to simply as Ukwala, is supermarket chain in Kenya, the largest economy in the East African Community. The supermarket chain is a subsidiary of Choppies, a retail conglomerate based in Gaborone, Botswana.

Location
The head office of Ukwala is on Haile Selassie Avenue, in Nairobi, the largest city in Kenya and the capital of that country.

Overview
Ukwala owns and operates supermarkets in Kenya. It is the fifth largest of the major supermarket chains in Kenya, behind Tuskys, Uchumi and Naivas.

Branches
, Ukwala maintained a total of eleven branches in Kenya. Another three new stores are in the pipeline, within 2018. Ukwala does not have any branches outside of Kenya.

Ownership
Ukwala is 75 percent owned by Choppies, a Botswana-based supermarket chain, whose stock is listed on both the Botswana Stock Exchange and Johannesburg Stock Exchange, with 157 stores in Africa. The remaining 25 percent shareholding is held by Export Trading Group, a Tanzanian company.

Recent developments
Beginning in April 2013, Tuskys Supermarkets, a rival chain, entered into a private deal with Ukwala, whereby Tuskys would buy six Ukwala stores in the Nairobi area. To arrive at a fair price, Tuskys took over the management of two of the stores, to assess traffic and commercial flow at those locations. The two chains did not consult the Competition Authority of Kenya (CAK), as required by law. When CAK learned of the transaction, the regulator stopped the deal and fined the two chains a total of KES:5.3 million (about US$62,000). CAK ordered the management arrangements to be reversed. When the supermarket chains did not move fast enough, CAK closed the two stores. Tuskys, however, obtained a temporary court injunction reversing the CAK directive, until a full court hearing on the matter can be arranged in the future.

On 29 May 2015, the Botswana-based supermarket chain Choppies reached an agreement to purchase Ukwala's ten stores for approximately US $10 million (KSh990 million). Five of the stores are located in Kisumu, three in Nairobi, and two in Nakuru. The owners of Ukwala are reported to be exiting the retail consumer business. The transaction received Kenyan regulatory approval in November 2015. In October 2016, Choppies announced its intention to invest KSh754.7 million (approx. US$7.57 million) into Ukwala, over the next three years, to open up more stores.

See also
List of supermarket chains in Kenya
Economy of Kenya

References

External links
The Most Popular Supermarkets In Nairobi, Kenya

Supermarkets of Kenya
Economy of Nairobi